The Journal of Counseling & Development is a peer-reviewed academic journal published quarterly by Wiley-Blackwell on behalf of the American Counseling Association. The journal was established in 1921 as the National Vocational Guidance Bulletin. In 1924 the titled changed to Vocational Guidance Magazine and, again, to Occupations: The Vocational Guidance Journal. In 1952 the titled became The Personnel and Guidance Journal and in 1984 the journal adapted the current name, Journal of Counseling & Development. The current editor-in-chief is Matthew E. Lemberger-Truelove (University of North Texas).

According to the Journal Citation Reports, the journal has a 2017 impact factor of 1.356, ranking it 57th out of 82 journals in the category "Psychology, Applied".

References

External links 
 

Wiley-Blackwell academic journals
Quarterly journals
Psychotherapy journals
Publications established in 1921
English-language journals